Jan Vermeulen, the Miller of Flanders (German: Jan Vermeulen, der Müller aus Flandern) is a 1917 German silent war drama film directed by Georg Jacoby. It was made as a propaganda film by the German film agency BUFA, which generally specialised in making documentaries but also made feature films such as this and Dr. Hart's Diary.

Location shooting took place around Bruges and Ghent in German-occupied Belgian Flanders.

Cast
Richard Bruno as Müller Jan Vermeulen 
Rose Veldtkirch as Müllerin Marianne Vermeulen 
Karl Berger as Arzt Genesius 
Fred Immler as Lehrer Johann Freihardt 
Alfred Jürgens as Sohn Pieter Vermeulen 
Léo Lasko as Müllersknecht

References

Bibliography
Bock, Hans-Michael & Bergfelder, Tim. The Concise CineGraph. Encyclopedia of German Cinema. Berghahn Books, 2009.

External links

Films of the German Empire
German silent feature films
Films directed by Georg Jacoby
1917 drama films
German World War I films
Films shot in Belgium
German black-and-white films
German war drama films
Films set in Flanders
1910s war drama films
Silent war drama films
1910s German films